Boletina griphoides is a Palearctic species of  'fungus gnat' in the family Mycetophilidae. The larvae of B. griphoides are thought to be mycetophagous in the ground litter. Adults sometimes appear in enormous numbers in spring in a wide variety of habitats.

References

Mycetophilidae
Insects described in 1925